Roebuck may refer to:

Animals
Roe buck or roebuck, a male roe deer

People
 Alvah Curtis Roebuck (1864–1948), American businessman, co-founder of Sears, Roebuck and Company
 Daniel Roebuck (born 1963), American television film actor, writer and producer
 Ellie Roebuck (born 1999), English association football player
 Gene Roebuck (born 1947), American college sports coach
 John Roebuck (1718–1794), English inventor
 John Arthur Roebuck (1802–1879), British politician and Member of Parliament
 Joseph Roebuck (born 1985), English swimmer
 Kristian Roebuck (born 1981), English badminton player
 Marty Roebuck (born 1965), Australian rugby union footballer
 Neil Roebuck (born 1969), English rugby league footballer of the 1980s and 1990s
 Nigel Roebuck (born 1946), English Formula One journalist
 Peter Roebuck (1956–2011), English-Australian cricketer and journalist
 Roy Roebuck (born 1929), British journalist, Member of Parliament and barrister
 Thomas Roebuck (1781–1819), British orientalist, translator, soldier and writer
 Disney Roebuck or Disney-Roebuck, British family whose members include:
 Henry Disney Roebuck (18th-century), builder of "folly" Midford Castle
 Francis Algernon Disney-Roebuck "Captain Roebuck" (1819–1885), theatre manager in South Africa
 Francis Henry Algernon Disney-Roebuck (1846–1919), English cricketer, a son
 Claude Delaval Disney-Roebuck (1876–1947), English cricketer, a grandson
Given name
 Pops Staples born Roebuck Staples (1914–2000), American gospel and R&B musician

Places

Geography
 Roebuck, Dublin, a townland in south county Dublin, Ireland
 Roebuck, South Carolina, United States
 Roebuck Bay, Western Australia
 Roebuck Estate, Holyhead Anglesey

Structures
 Roebuck Castle, home of the School of Law at University College Dublin, Ireland
 The Roebuck, a Grade II listed public house at 50 Great Dover Street, Borough, London

Other uses
 Roebuck, a character in Call of Duty: World at War
 Roebuck Wright, a character in The French Dispatch
 Roebuck (Wicca), tradition begun by Robert Cochrane
 HMS Roebuck, the name of 14 ships of the Royal Navy
Sears, Roebuck and Company, colloquially known as "Sears", an American chain of department stores founded by Richard Warren Sears and Alvah Curtis Roebuck